Infinity Baby is an American science fiction comedy film directed by Bob Byington from a screenplay by Onur Tukel. The film stars Kieran Culkin, Trieste Kelly Dunn, Nick Offerman, Martin Starr, Kevin Corrigan, Megan Mullally, Noël Wells, and Stephen Root. It was released in 2017.

Plot
The film is described as a "lightly futuristic comedy about babies who don’t age."

Cast
Kieran Culkin as Ben
Trieste Kelly Dunn as Alison
Nick Offerman as Neo
Martin Starr as Malcolm
Kevin Corrigan as Larry
Megan Mullally as Hester
Noël Wells as Theresa
Stephen Root as Fenton
Martha Kelly as Ava
Jonathan Togo as Intern
Zoe Graham as Tiffany
Jennifer Prediger as Lydia

Production
Principal photography for the film began in April 2016.

Release
The film premiered at South by Southwest in March 2017.

References

External links
 

2017 films
American science fiction comedy films
2010s English-language films
Films directed by Bob Byington
2010s American films